World League Soccer, known as  in Japan, is an association football-based sports video game developed by C-Lab, and released for Super NES and Sharp X68000 systems in 1991.

Gameplay 

This video game was ported from the original Amiga version called Kick Off 2, which was one of the most popular soccer game of the early 1990s. The game features a full tournament mode in addition to four different pitches (including a plastic pitch which caused controversy in the 1980s for some English football clubs). The game's two-player mode largely requires on luck instead of skill to make plays like goals and free kicks. While the graphics are standard for the Super NES, the "jerky" scrolling destroys the limited playability that exists in the game.

Each game has a large field along with a massive variety of options and a signature overhead view; making the game similar to World Championship Soccer for the Sega Mega Drive; however, the viewpoint is much to be desired and the almost complete lack of gameplay spoil all the enjoyment out of the game. Ball handling controls tend to be extremely difficult despite the simplistic approach to soccer. A variety of moves, including the aftertouch, are fully accessible with by only using one button on a standard joystick. This is a feature that is exclusive to this game and not found even on modern soccer games.

Pro Soccer 68 
Pro Soccer 68 was released for the Sharp X68000 in 1991. It was developed by SPS and published by Imagineer. Pro Soccer (known in Europe and US as Super Kick Off) was also released for the Game Boy in 1992.

References 

1991 video games
Association football video games
C-Lab games
Imagineer games
X68000 games
Super Nintendo Entertainment System games
Multiplayer and single-player video games
Video games developed in Japan
Mindscape games